The Submission of the Clergy Act 1533 (25 Hen 8 c 19) is an Act of the Parliament of the United Kingdom.

This Act was partly in force in Great Britain at the end of 2010.

The whole Act, so far as unrepealed, except sections 1 and 3, was repealed by section 1 of, and Part II of the Schedule to the Statute Law (Repeals) Act 1969.

The repeal by the Statute Law (Repeals) Act 1969 of section 2 of the Act of Supremacy (1 Eliz 1 c 1) (1558) does not affect the continued operation, so far as unrepealed, of the Submission of the Clergy Act 1533.

Section 1(3) of the Synodical Government Measure 1969 provides:

The "said Convocations" are the Convocations of Canterbury and York, which are referred to in section 1(1).

Section 3
This section (which provides that no Canons shall be contrary to the Royal Prerogative or the customs, laws or statutes of this realm) does not apply to any rule of ecclesiastical law relating to any matter for which provision may be made by Canon in pursuance of the Church of England (Worship and Doctrine) Measure 1974 or section 1 of the Church of England (Miscellaneous Provisions) Measure1976.

Section 4
In this section, the words of commencement were repealed by section 1 of, and Schedule 1 to, the Statute Law Revision Act 1948.

In this section, the words from "but that all manner of appelles" to the end were repealed by section 87 of, and Schedule 5 to, the Ecclesiastical Jurisdiction Measure 1963 (No 1).

Section 5
In this section, the words of commencement were repealed by section 1 of, and Schedule 1 to, the Statute Law Revision Act 1948.

This section was repealed by section 13 of, and Part I of Schedule 4 to, the Criminal Law Act 1967.

Section 6
This section was repealed by section 87 of, and Schedule 5 to, the Ecclesiastical Jurisdiction Measure 1963.

References
Halsbury's Statutes,

External links
The Submission of the Clergy Act 1533, as amended, from the National Archives.

Acts of the Parliament of England (1485–1603)
1533 in law
1533 in England